Joaquim Xavier Curado, the first and only baron with greatness and count of São João das Duas Barras (Pirenópolis, 2 December 1746 - Rio de Janeiro, 15 September 1830), was a Brazilian military officer and politician.

References

1746 births
1830 deaths
Brazilian monarchists
Brazilian nobility